Johnny X may refer to:

 A stage name for Pete Gofton.
 A 1995 extended play album from The Bouncing Souls.
 A name for a super hero that is really Johnny Test. See Johnny X.